"That's Entertainment!" is a popular song with music written by Arthur Schwartz and lyrics by Howard Dietz. The song was published in 1952 and was written especially for the 1953 Metro-Goldwyn-Mayer musical film The Band Wagon. The song is performed in the film by Jack Buchanan supported by Fred Astaire, Nanette Fabray, and Oscar Levant.

In 2004, the song finished at number 45 in AFI's 100 Years...100 Songs survey of top tunes in American cinema. It was orchestrated for the film by  Conrad Salinger under the musical direction of Adolph Deutsch.

Since the movie, the song has become the signature tune for Metro-Goldwyn-Mayer and an anthem for Hollywood and theater in general, being used as an opening number in many shows. Alongside "Hooray for Hollywood," "There's No Business Like Show Business" and "Another Op'nin', Another Show", it is considered one of the American entertainment industry's best known tunes.

The song is perhaps most associated with Judy Garland, who recorded it for her 1960 LP That's Entertainment!, using a shortened version of the original Salinger arrangement. A year later, a live version appeared on Garland's Grammy-winning double album Judy at Carnegie Hall. She also performed it on The Judy Garland Show where she dances around the TV stage during an orchestral interlude.

The song has become nearly synonymous with Metro-Goldwyn-Mayer. The studio used the tune for its 1955-56 television series MGM Parade which featured clips from past and forthcoming MGM films. The song title was later used for MGM's popular retrospective film series featuring clips from its golden age, as That's Entertainment!. The original 1974 release spawned two sequels in which the song was retained. The studio also used a remix of Judy Garland's recording of the song to underscore the trailer for the January 15, 2023 launch of the network and streaming platform MGM+, following the network's rebrand from Epix. The 1974 film was also added to the network's streaming platform the same day as the rebrand's launch.

In That's Entertainment, Part II, some new lyrics were added to the song and performed by hosts Gene Kelly and Astaire. The film credited those lyrics to Dietz and Saul Chaplin, one of the film's producers, though Chaplin was known as a composer, not a lyricist.

In 1979, the song was sung with parody lyrics by the villain Mordru in the television special Legends of the Superheroes. In the 1980s, the song was performed, again with new lyrics, by Larry Santos in a commercial for TV Guide magazine.

Renditions
Rufus Wainwright - Rufus Does Judy at Carnegie Hall (2007)

References

Songs about theatre
Hollywood, Los Angeles in fiction
Songs with music by Arthur Schwartz
Songs with lyrics by Howard Dietz
Fred Astaire songs
1952 songs